Ergas Leps (born 25 August 1939) is an Estonian-born Canadian athlete. He competed at the 1960 Summer Olympics and the 1964 Summer Olympics.

References

1939 births
Living people
Athletes (track and field) at the 1960 Summer Olympics
Athletes (track and field) at the 1964 Summer Olympics
Canadian male middle-distance runners
Olympic track and field athletes of Canada
Athletes (track and field) at the 1966 British Empire and Commonwealth Games
Athletes (track and field) at the 1970 British Commonwealth Games
Commonwealth Games competitors for Canada
Michigan Wolverines men's track and field athletes
Athletes from Tallinn
Estonian emigrants to Canada
Estonian World War II refugees